Alexander Borodin (1833–1887) was a Russian classical composer, doctor and chemist.

Borodin may also refer to:

Borodin (surname), Russian surname
6780 Borodin, asteroid named after Alexander Borodin
Mount Borodin, Antarctic mountain
Borodin Quartet, Russian string quartet
Borodin Trio, Russian classical music trio

See also
Boro Din, Christmas in Bangladesh